Franklin Municipal–John Beverly Rose Airport, also known as Franklin Municipal Airport or John Beverly Rose Field  is a public airport in Isle of Wight County, Virginia, United States. The airport is owned by the City of Franklin and is located at 32470 John Beverly Rose Drive, two nautical miles (4 km) northeast of the city's central business district.

Facilities and aircraft 
It has one runway designated 9/27 with a 4,977 x 100 ft (1,517 x 30 m) asphalt surface. Two former runways, 14/32 and 4/22, are in no longer used and marked with yellow X's.

For the 12-month period ending March 31, 2007, the airport had 5,012 aircraft operations, an average of 13 per day: 70% general aviation, 30% military and <1% air taxi. At that time there were 25 aircraft based at this airport: 84% single-engine, 12% multi-engine and 4% ultralight.

References

External links 

Airports in Virginia
Franklin, Virginia
Buildings and structures in Isle of Wight County, Virginia
Transportation in Isle of Wight County, Virginia